Tropic Ocean Airways is a seaplane charter and scheduled service airline based in Fort Lauderdale, Florida. Tropic operates several Cessna airframes on floats.

Services 
Tropic Ocean Airways operates scheduled and charter seaplane services throughout the Bahamas, and sometimes Florida. Tropic also operates provisioning services to vessels at sea. During the summer season, Tropic operates scheduled services for Blade and charter services out of New York Skyports Inc. Seaplane Base.

Bahamas and Florida 
Tropic Ocean Airways flies several scheduled and charter services year round, out of Fort Lauderdale International Airport and Miami Seaplane Base. Scheduled flights are to the Bahamas as Florida scheduled flights were short lived. Tropic also offers seaplane charter flights, and vessel provisioning services for ships at sea.

Northeastern US 
During the summer season, Tropic Ocean Airways operates Cessna Seaplanes from New York Seaplane Base to several  charter destinations in the region.

Puerto Rico 
On October 4th, 2019 Tropic Ocean Airways announced that they would be opening a base in Puerto Rico and now has one plane and a two-pilot crew stationed in San Juan; it plans to bring as many as six planes on the Caribbean island by 2020. The new flights will include private charters, scheduled flights, “dock to yacht” and cargo services. Charter flights will include destinations like the BVI, Necker Island, Antigua, St Maarten, St Kitts, Nevis and Anguilla, the company said. Flights will depart both from the Jet Aviation fixed-base operator at Luis Munoz Marin airport, along with the Bahia Urbana dock in Old San Juan.

Essential Air Service bid 
On December 19th, 2017 Tropic Ocean Airways unsuccessfully attempted to bid into the US government's Essential Air Services (EAS) programme following the submission of a proposal to serve the Arizona town of Show Low. 

In their proposal, Tropic Ocean put forward two options. The first entails 18 weekly return flights between Show Low and Phoenix Sky Harbor for an annual subsidy of USD $1,429,050, while the second entails a total of 24 weekly return flights from Show Low to Phoenix Sky Harbor (12x weekly), six flights to Tucson Int'l, and six to Albuquerque. The annual subsidy requested here is USD $1,963,750.

The Show Low EAS contract was awarded to Boutique Air for an annual subsidy of USD $1,243,255.

Destinations

Current scheduled service

Current charter service regions  
The Bahamas
Puerto Rico
Florida
Northeastern United States - seasonal (summer) scheduled flights operated for Blade

Fleet 
, Tropic Ocean Airways operates the following aircraft.

References 

Airlines established in 2009
Airlines based in Florida
American companies established in 2009
Seaplane operators
Companies based in Fort Lauderdale, Florida
2009 establishments in Florida
Charter airlines of the United States
Regional airlines of the United States